Athletics at the 2014 Pan American Sports Festival took place from August 15 to 16, 2014.  The event was held at the Estadio Jesús Martínez "Palillo" in Mexico City, Mexico.  A total of 34 events were contested, 17 by men and 17 by women. There were no road races, no relays, and no combined events.

The winner of each competition qualifies automatically for the 2015 Pan American Games in Toronto.

Medal summary

The results and medal winners were published.

Men

Women

 Three competitors entered the pole vault but Mexico's Martha Olimpia Villalobos failed to record a valid height.

Medal table

Participation
According to an unofficial count, 270 athletes from 36 countries participated.

 (2)
 (6)
 (1)
 (5)
 (2)
 (2)
 (14)
 (10)
 (16)
 (2)
 (40)
 (3)
 (5)
 (2)
 (2)
 (1)
 (1)
 (3)
 (2)
 (2)
 (35)
 (46)
 (1)
 (5)
 (7)
 (4)
 (9)
 (3)
 (3)
 (3)
 (2)
 (1)
 (4)
 (19)
 (3)
 (4)

References

Athletics
2014 Pan American Sports Festival
2014 Pan American Sports Festival
Pan American Sports Festival
Pan American Sports Festival